The 1981 Five Nations Championship was the fifty-second series of the rugby union Five Nations Championship. Including the previous incarnations as the Home Nations and Five Nations, this was the eighty-seventh series of the northern hemisphere rugby union championship. Ten matches were played between 17 January and 21 March.

 were the winners, winning the championship outright for the eighth time. They had also shared the title on four other occasions. In winning all their four matches they also won the Grand Slam for the third time.

Participants
The teams involved were:

Table

Squads

Results

External links

The official RBS Six Nations Site

Six Nations Championship seasons
Five Nations
Five Nations
Five Nations
Five Nations
Five Nations
Five Nations
 
Five Nations
Five Nations
Five Nations